Miles from Tomorrowland (also known as Miles from Tomorrow  as an original production title and internationally) is an American CGI-animated children's television series created by Sascha Paladino. The series aired as shorts from January 19 to 23 before officially premiering on February 6, 2015. This series is named after Tomorrowland in the Disney theme parks. For the series' third season, which debuted on October 16, 2017 on the Disney Channel, it was renamed Mission Force One.

The series ended after three seasons, with the series finale airing on September 10, 2018.

Plot
Miles from Tomorrowland is a CGI-animated space adventure series set in the year of 2500.  It centers on the Callisto family who live on a spaceship called the Stellosphere and work for the Tomorrowland Transit Authority (TTA).

Set in outer space, the series follows the adventures of the Callisto family – Miles, his sister Loretta and their scientist parents Phoebe and Leo, who work for the Tomorrowland Transit Authority (TTA) on a mission to connect the universe. Each episode consists of two 11-minute stories as Miles and his family explore extraterrestrial planets.

In Season 3, Miles is now leading a team called Mission Force One, which consists of his sister, Loretta, and their friends, Haruna, Blodger and Mirandos as they continue their mission to Connect and Protect the Tomorrowland Transit Authority (TTA), while also dealing with a new threat: the Nemesystems.

Episodes

Characters
The show's voice director is Lisa Schaeffer.

Main 
Callisto family:
  Miles Callisto (voiced by Cullen McCarthy in season 1 and Justin Felbinger in seasons 2 & 3) is an enthusiastic and curious 10-year-old boy with a somewhat reckless inventive streak whom the series is named after.  His catchphrases are "Blastastic!," "Superstellar!," "Galactic!," "Aw, craters!," and "Let's rocket!" He is also the captain of the newly established Mission Force One. He possesses a hovering skateboard called a "blastboard" and a boomerang known as a "lazerang". As the captain of Mission Force One, he now has a blast shield that doubles as a blastboard, as well as a lazerang that can extend and become a staff.
  Loretta Callisto (voiced by Fiona Bishop) is Miles' big 11-year-old girl and the brainier of the two children. She is a technology whiz. She also likes to read directions and follow the rules. She is nicknamed "Starshine" by her mom and dad. She is also Mission Force One's mission specialist, and as a member of Mission Force One, she wields holographic chakrams.
  Madame Phoebe Callisto (née Liang; voiced by Olivia Munn) is Loretta and Miles' mother and the ship's captain. She is an ambitious and accomplished woman who excels in her career and challenges her family to do their best.
  Leo Callisto (voiced by Tom Kenny) is Loretta and Miles' father and the ship's engineer and Stellar Mechanic.  He is also a pilot and the inventor of the family.  Leo demonstrates a relaxed attitude which leads him to problem-solve in innovative ways.

Callisto companions:
  Stella (voiced by Grey Griffin) is the computer voice at the ship Stellosphere.
  M.E.R.C. (Mechanical Emotionally Responsive Creature; voiced by Dee Bradley Baker) is the family's pet robot ostrich who is never far from Miles's side.

Watson and Crick:
  Admiral Watson (voiced by Danny Jacobs) is one head of the Tomorrowland Transit Authority.
  Admiral Crick (voiced by Diedrich Bader) – One head of the Tomorrowland Transit Authority.

These character names are presumably an allusion to the discoverers of the structure of DNA, James Watson and Francis Crick.

Recurring
  Captain Joe (voiced by Adrian Grenier) is an intergalactic crime fighter, Leo's brother, and Miles and Loretta's uncle. He also owns a robot dog, Cap9, who seems related to Scooby-doo.
  Grandpa Vincent (voiced by Jonathan Frakes) is Leo's father and retired captain of the TTA ship Explorer
  Gadfly Garnett (voiced by Mark Hamill) is an alien outlaw obsessed with owning the latest technology. Usually he will say "I am Gadfly Garnet, the greatest galactic outlaw ever to..."
  Spectryx (voiced by George Takei) is an alien from planet Parallax who can only see in infrared.
  Professor Randii Rubicon (voiced by Bill Nye) is a scientist who mostly studies Neptune and the Builders. He gave the Cosmic Explorers and Loretta a tour of the Trident Research Station in Neptune.
  Commander S'leet (voiced by Wil Wheaton)
  Lysander Floovox (voiced by Alton Brown)
  Auntie Frida (voiced by Brenda Song) is Phoebe's sister. She can do a 1-arm handstand on Mars and paints while doing so.
  Mr. Avon Xylon (voiced by Dee Bradley Baker) is an alien mailman. Baker also portrays Lieutenant Luminex, Captain Joe's second in command.
  The Game Master (voiced by Whoopi Goldberg) is a play creative tech genius.
  Dr. Consilium (voiced by LeVar Burton) is a Galactic School teacher.
  Dr. Zephyr Skye (a.k.a. Dr. Z.; voiced by Ginger Zee) is Tomorrowland's leading meteorologist.
  Haruna Kitumba (voiced by Issac Ryan Brown) is Miles's best friend & neighbor prior to Miles' departure to space who serves as a navigator of the Mission Force One. His Mission Force One armored suit gives him the ability to punch through anything.
  Pipp Wimpley (voiced by Ethan Wacker) is a young alien from Atlantix.
  Mirandos (voiced by Ivy Bishop) is a young intelligent Ariellian from the planet Tempestoro who serves as an engineer of Mission Force One. She wears gloves known as "Solidizer gloves" that can create any object for any mission.
  Dashiell Scamp (voiced by Diedrich Bader) is an alien that "trades" for robots
  Zeno (voiced by Manny Montana) is the computer voice of the starship Zenith.
  Commander Nemex (voiced by Elan Garfias) is the commander of the Nemesystems. He is later revealed to be Silas, a TTA Cadet who was rejected from Mission Force One.
  Aggro (voiced by John DiMaggio) - The second-in-command of the Nemesystems.

Blopp family
  Captain Bobble Blopp (voiced by Danny Jacobs)
  Blippy Blopp (voiced by Tom Kenny)
  Blodger Blopp (voiced by Sam Lavagnino) is the son of Bobble and Blippy, Miles' friend from planet Blobsberg who serves as a ship operator of Mission Force One. As a member of Mission Force One, he can shapeshift into any inanimate object he thinks of.

Dethalians
  Queen Gemma (voiced by Grey Griffin) is the queen of the Dethalians. Ever since Gadfly tried to steal her technology, she doesn't trust anyone who trespasses into her territory uninvited. However, in some episodes, she becomes a reluctant ally and shows a kinder side. She loves her son Rygan and is very protective of him.
  Prince Rygan (voiced by Rio Mangini) is Queen Gemma's son. Rygan made friends with Miles and helped him and his family escape after Queen Gemma arrested them for entering her kingdom without permission. In Scavengers of Mars, he becomes a Cosmic Explorer and joins the scavenger hunt.

Production
Kanter said "We hope this series will influence a child's interest in science and technology by introducing them at an early age to the exciting world of space exploration, how things work and what lies beyond the here and now." A total of 24 episodes, each consisting of two 11-minute stories, were ordered for the series' first season.

On April 28, 2015, the series was renewed for a second season, which premiered on June 20, 2016. On September 1, 2017, it was renewed for a third season, but the series was renamed Mission Force One.

"Miles from Tomorrowland" is made by using Autodesk Maya. The CGI character designs were created with Adobe Photoshop and Adobe After Effects, and the 3D models were created in Maya. The episodes are edited with Adobe Premiere.

Broadcast
Miles from Tomorrowland premiered on Disney Junior in Canada on February 21. In Australia and New Zealand, Disney Junior premiered the series on April 18. In the United Kingdom and Ireland, the show premiered on Disney Junior on May 11 as Miles from Tomorrow. In Asia, it premiered on Disney Junior on August 17. In India, it premiered on Disney Junior on February 6, 2016.

Home media
Home media is distributed by Walt Disney Studios Home Entertainment.

Reception
The series was watched by more than 2.5 million viewers in the United Kingdom and 10% of British kids aged 4 to 7 watched it in the first week alone, making it the UK's highest rated pay TV kids channel. It was the highest rated show on Disney Junior for May 2015. Across the EMEA region, it received 8.7 million viewers, including 2.6 million young kids and 1.1 million boys.

Neil Genzlinger of the New York Times called it "enjoyable." He went on to say, "This family is a foursome plus pet, but if The Jetsons was some kind of inspiration for it, everyone has received an upgrade... Yes, it's a bit creepy to think of two children being raised in the claustrophobic confines of a four-person spaceship, home schooling taken to an extreme. But the show is fast-moving enough to keep young viewers interested... and it's not shy about putting Miles and Loretta in gently life-threatening predicaments. Parents, meanwhile, might get a kick out of guessing who is providing the voices of some recurring characters."

Rob Owen of the Pittsburgh Post-Gazette said "'Miles from Tomorrowland' has some real science facts threaded through it- there's mention of Jupiter's moon lo in an early episode- but given how these factoids sit side-by-side with the science fiction gadgets and spaceships, its unclear what positive educational impact their inclusion will have." He also noted that "the show's family role modeling is commendable."

Since airing, Miles from Tomorrowland has achieved ratings success for Disney. According to a press release by Disney–ABC Television Group using data from Nielsen, across Q3 of 2015 (6/29 through 9/27), Miles from Tomorrowland was the fourth highest-rated series across preschooler-dedicated TV networks in the USA with 653,000 total viewers ages 2+ who watched the show on Disney Junior. This ranking was surpassed only by PJ Masks (767,000), Sofia the First (667,000), and Mickey Mouse Clubhouse (666,000), all Disney Junior shows as well.

References

External links
Official Website
 

Disney Junior original programming
2010s American animated television series
2015 American television series debuts
2018 American television series endings
2010s American science fiction television series
American children's animated space adventure television series
American children's animated science fiction television series
American computer-animated television series
Disney animated television series
American preschool education television series
Animated television series about children
Animated television series about families
Television series by Disney
Television series set in the future
Television series set in the 26th century
Television series set in outer space
Animated preschool education television series
2010s preschool education television series
English-language television shows